Scaeva albomaculata is a European species of hoverfly.

References

Diptera of Europe
Syrphinae
Insects described in 1842
Taxa named by Pierre-Justin-Marie Macquart